Hongqiao (Shanghainese: ghon1jiau1) is a town in Minhang District, in the western suburbs of Shanghai. , it has 33 residential communities (居委会) under its administration.

See also 
 List of township-level divisions of Shanghai

References

External links 

Towns in Shanghai
Minhang District